On 25 August 2010, a Let L-410 Turbolet passenger aircraft of Filair crashed on approach to Bandundu Airport in the Democratic Republic of the Congo, killing all but one of the 21 people on board.

The accident was reportedly the result of the occupants rushing to the front of the aircraft to escape from a crocodile smuggled on board by one of the passengers. The move compromised the aircraft's balance to the point that control of the aircraft was lost.

Accident
The aircraft was operating a round-robin domestic flight from Kinshasa, Democratic Republic of the Congo, stopping at Kiri, Bokoro, Semendwa and Bandundu. At 13:00 local time (12:00 UTC), while on final approach to Bandundu Airport, the aircraft crashed into a house approximately  short of the runway. According to most sources, no one was injured on the ground. 19 people were killed instantaneously, with two survivors being taken to hospital, one of whom later died from their injuries. Of the 21 people on board, only one, a passenger, survived. Most of the dead were Congolese. There was no post-impact fire, a circumstance that led to initial speculation that the aircraft may have suffered fuel exhaustion.

Aircraft

The aircraft was a 1991-built Let L-410 Turbolet, with Congolese registration 9Q-CCN, construction number 912608. It normally carries up to 19 passengers. The aircraft involved was previously registered ES-LLB, and was operated by Airest, an Estonian airline, until 2007. It was stored until Filair bought it in 2009.

Investigation
The Congolese Ministry of Transport opened an investigation into the accident. There was no confirmation that fuel shortage caused the crash.

The only survivor of the crash stated to the investigators that a crocodile smuggled in a duffel bag by one of the passengers had escaped shortly before landing, sparking panic among the passengers. The flight attendant rushed towards the cockpit, followed by all passengers, and the resulting shift in the aircraft's centre of gravity led to an irrecoverable loss of control. The crocodile reportedly survived the crash but was killed by a blow from a machete.

See also
 List of accidents and incidents involving airliners in the Democratic Republic of the Congo

References

Aviation accidents and incidents in the Democratic Republic of the Congo
Aviation accidents and incidents in 2010
Accidents and incidents involving the Let L-410 Turbolet
Filair Let L-410 Crash, 2010
August 2010 events in Africa
2010 disasters in the Democratic Republic of the Congo